Ambition Public School is a senior secondary school affiliated to C.B.S.E., New Delhi. The school is located in Jhabrera town of district Haridwar, Uttarakhand, India. It was founded by Mr. Vishwas Singh Panwar in 2005 with a mission to provide the English medium education to the children of rural area at a very low fee structure. It has strong focus on discipline and overall development of the students.

The students are from different villages, caste and background.

Co-curricular activities 

The school maintain a good balance between academics and extracurricular activities by arranging weekly competitions related to Soft Skills development, Art & Craft and Sports. It has divided students in four groups - Blue House, Red House, Green House and Yellow House. The prayer activities and event organization are managed by house students under the guidance of the coordinator teachers. The best performers are motivated by giving them appreciation certificates and prizes.

References

External links

Haridwar district
Private schools in Uttarakhand
2005 establishments in Uttarakhand
Educational institutions established in 2005